Heliophanus imperator is a jumping spider species in the genus Heliophanus.  It was first described by Wanda Wesołowska in 1986 and lives in Kenya and Malawi.

References

Spiders described in 1986
Invertebrates of Kenya
Invertebrates of Malawi
Salticidae
Spiders of Africa
Taxa named by Wanda Wesołowska